Moson Kahni was a wintering town used by the Northern Shoshone tribe during the 19th century.  It is located within the Cache Valley, in parts of current-day Franklin and Preston, Idaho.  In Shoshoni, Moson Kahni means "Home of the Lungs", a reference to the plentiful amounts of holocrystalline syeno-diorite, which appeared to look like lungs to the Shoshone.  Moson Kahni is considered to be a major Shoshone shelter and permanent winter encampment for the tribe.

In popular culture
In the turn-based strategy video game Civilization V, Moson Kahni appears as the capital of the playable Shoshone civilization for the Civilization V: Brave New World expansion pack.

References

Geography of Franklin County, Idaho
Northern Shoshone